The 2010 FIA European Touring Car Cup was the sixth running of the FIA European Touring Car Cup. The cup was expanded to three events for 2010, unlike in previous years where it was a one-off event. The season began at Braga on 28 March, and finished at Franciacorta on 17 October. Three FIA cups were awarded at the end of the season, one per each of the eligible categories: Super 2000, Super 1600 and Super Production. 100,000 euro prize money was awarded at each of the four race meetings: 65,000 euros to Super 2000, 25,000 to Super 1600 and 10,000 to Super Production.

In the top Super 2000 class, despite pressure from Michel Nykjær – who won each of the four races he contested at the Salzburgring and Franciacorta – in a SEAT León TDI, Hartmann Honda Racing's James Thompson finished as the class winner, with six top-three finishes in the season's six races, taking a victory in Braga en route to a four-point title win. César Campaniço was the other race winner at Braga, in a one-off outing in the Cup. Super Production was poorly supported with only Vojislav Lekić, Fabio Fabiani and Marcis Birkens competing in any of the races. Lekić won the four races he contested, ahead of Fabiani while Birkens suffered a retirement and a DNS in Braga. Carsten Seifert won the Super 1600 title, with six top-two finishes including three wins, and won the class by ten points from Jens Löhnig, who took the other three wins during the season.

Teams and drivers

1 Despite being on the Salzburgring entry list, Čolak did not compete at the meeting.

2 Despite being listed on the FIA ETCC website, Carvalho did not attend any of the meetings.

3 Although he was present at the Salzburgring meeting, Mayer did not take part. Instead he chose to focus on the ADAC Procar championship round which was held at the same event.

Race calendar and results

Championship standings

Super 2000

Super Production

Super 1600

References

External links
Official website of the FIA European Touring Car Cup

European Touring Car Cup
European Touring Car Cup
2010 in European sport